is a passenger railway station located in Naka-ku, Sakai, Osaka Prefecture, Japan, operated by the Semboku Rapid Railway. It is station number SB02.

Lines

Station layout
The station consists of one elevated island platform with the station building underneath.

Platforms

Adjacent stations

History
Fukai Station opened on April 1, 1971.

Passenger statistics
In fiscal 2019, the station was used by an average of 26,156 passengers daily (boarding passengers only).

Surrounding area
 Sakai City Naka Ward Office
 Sakai City Peace and Human Rights Museum (Phoenix Museum)
 Osaka Prefectural Higashi Mozu High School

See also
List of railway stations in Japan

References

External links

Semboku Rapid Railway official page

Railway stations in Japan opened in 1971
Railway stations in Osaka Prefecture
Sakai, Osaka